Azul y Blanco (Spanish for 'Blue and White') was a political weekly newspaper published from Tegucigalpa, Honduras. It was founded in 1914. Vidal Mejía became the first editor of the newspaper in 1915.

Azul y Blanco was printed at El Sol printing press in Comayagüela.

References

1914 establishments in Honduras
Weekly newspapers
Newspapers published in Honduras
Spanish-language newspapers